Gustaf Sigurd Vilhelm Kander (29 January 1890 – 30 April 1980) was a Swedish sailor. He was a crew member of the Swedish boat Erna Signe that won the silver medal in the 12 m class at the 1912 Summer Olympics.

References

1890 births
1980 deaths
Swedish male sailors (sport)
Sailors at the 1912 Summer Olympics – 12 Metre
Olympic sailors of Sweden
Olympic silver medalists for Sweden
Olympic medalists in sailing
Royal Swedish Yacht Club sailors
Medalists at the 1912 Summer Olympics
Sportspeople from Stockholm